Treaty of Saint Petersburg or Treaty of St. Petersburg may refer to:

Treaty of Saint Petersburg (1723), concluded between the Persian Empire and the Russian Empire
Treaty of Saint Petersburg (1755), Great Britain promises subsidies to the Russian Empire on the eve of the Seven Years' War
Treaty of Saint Petersburg (1762), ending the Seven Years' War between Prussia and Russia following the accession of Tsar Peter III
Treaty of Saint Petersburg (1805), signed by the British Empire and the Russian Empire to create an alliance against Napoleon's French Empire
Treaty of Saint Petersburg (1812), an alliance between Russia and Sweden against the French Empire of Napoleon
Treaty of Saint Petersburg (1825), defined the boundaries in the area that later became Alaska
Treaty of Saint Petersburg (1826), a treaty between the United Kingdoms of Sweden and Norway and the Russian Empire
Treaty of Saint Petersburg (1834), concluded between the Ottoman Porte and Russia
St. Petersburg Declaration of 1868, a predecessor of the Hague Conventions of 1899 and 1907
Treaty of Saint Petersburg (1875), a treaty between the Empire of Japan and Empire of Russia about disputed islands
Treaty of Saint Petersburg (1881), a treaty between the Russian Empire and the Chinese Empire
Anglo-Russian Entente (1907)

See also 

 Convention of St Petersburg (disambiguation)
 Saint Petersburg Declaration (disambiguation)